The Inch is a cricket ground in Balrothery, County Dublin, Ireland.  The first recorded match on the ground was in 2001, when North County played The Hills.  In 2005, the ground hosted two List A matches in the 2005 ICC Trophy.  The first of these saw Denmark play the Netherlands, which resulted in a victory by six wickets for the Netherlands.  The second of these saw Oman play the United States, which resulted three wicket victory for Oman.

In 2011, it was one of the venues for the 2011 ICC Under-19 Cricket World Cup Qualifier.

References

External links
The Inch, Dublin at CricketArchive

Cricket grounds in the Republic of Ireland
Sports venues in Fingal
Sports venues completed in 2001
Cricket grounds in County Dublin
21st-century architecture in the Republic of Ireland